James Clyde Ross (31 July 1895 – 10 June 1975) was an Australian politician.

He was born at Marrickville in Sydney to glass manufacturer Frank Ross and Edith Mary, née Price. He attended Arncliffe College and served in the 18th Battalion of the Australian Imperial Force during World War I, rising to the rank of major. On 13 May 1918 he married Gwendoline Ella Dew. After the war he worked as a clothing manufacturer and commercial traveller and was prominent in the All for Australia League. In 1932 he was elected to the New South Wales Legislative Assembly as the United Australia Party member for Kogarah, serving until his defeat in 1941. He was known as an opponent of Premier and party leader Bertram Stevens, and was one of those to vote against him in the successful no-confidence motion in 1939. Ross died in 1975 at Wentworthville.

References

 

1895 births
1975 deaths
United Australia Party members of the Parliament of New South Wales
Members of the New South Wales Legislative Assembly
Australian soldiers
Politicians from Sydney
20th-century Australian politicians